Víctor Rolando Sabillón Sabillón (born 12 October 1963 in Santa Bárbara) is a Honduran politician. He currently serves as deputy Vice-President of the National Congress of Honduras representing the Liberal Party of Honduras for Santa Bárbara.

References

1963 births
Living people
People from Santa Bárbara Department, Honduras
Deputies of the National Congress of Honduras
Liberal Party of Honduras politicians